This is a partial list of unnumbered minor planets for principal provisional designations assigned during 1–15 October 2003. , a total of 299 bodies remain unnumbered for this period. Objects for this year are listed on the following pages: A–E · F–G · H–L · M–R · Si · Sii · Siii · Siv · T · Ui · Uii · Uiii · Uiv · V · Wi · Wii and X–Y. Also see previous and next year.

T 

|- id="2003 TG" bgcolor=#FA8072
| – || 2003 TG || MCA || 20.7 || data-sort-value="0.22" | 220 m || single || 2 days || 03 Oct 2003 || 13 || align=left | Disc.: Spacewatch || 
|- id="2003 TO" bgcolor=#FA8072
| – || 2003 TO || MCA || 18.6 || data-sort-value="0.57" | 570 m || single || 56 days || 28 Nov 2003 || 14 || align=left | Disc.: Spacewatch || 
|- id="2003 TW" bgcolor=#d6d6d6
| 1 || 2003 TW || MBA-O || 16.9 || 2.3 km || multiple || 2003–2021 || 09 Jan 2021 || 111 || align=left | Disc.: Table Mountain Obs.Alt.: 2014 VW16 || 
|- id="2003 TK1" bgcolor=#FFC2E0
| 1 ||  || AMO || 24.3 || data-sort-value="0.049" | 49 m || multiple || 2003–2018 || 12 Nov 2018 || 84 || align=left | Disc.: Spacewatch || 
|- id="2003 TL1" bgcolor=#FFC2E0
| 5 ||  || AMO || 19.9 || data-sort-value="0.37" | 370 m || single || 84 days || 13 Dec 2003 || 113 || align=left | Disc.: LINEAR || 
|- id="2003 TM1" bgcolor=#FFC2E0
| 1 ||  || APO || 22.1 || data-sort-value="0.14" | 140 m || multiple || 2003–2016 || 09 Feb 2016 || 78 || align=left | Disc.: LINEAR || 
|- id="2003 TR1" bgcolor=#E9E9E9
| 0 ||  || MBA-M || 17.8 || data-sort-value="0.82" | 820 m || multiple || 2003–2021 || 10 Jan 2021 || 40 || align=left | Disc.: SpacewatchAdded on 9 March 2021 || 
|- id="2003 TF2" bgcolor=#d6d6d6
| 0 ||  || MBA-O || 16.44 || 2.9 km || multiple || 2003–2021 || 07 Oct 2021 || 60 || align=left | Disc.: Table Mountain Obs. || 
|- id="2003 TG2" bgcolor=#FFC2E0
| 3 ||  || ATE || 21.2 || data-sort-value="0.20" | 200 m || multiple || 2003–2016 || 10 Oct 2016 || 56 || align=left | Disc.: LPL/Spacewatch II || 
|- id="2003 TH2" bgcolor=#FFC2E0
| 4 ||  || APO || 22.8 || data-sort-value="0.098" | 98 m || single || 25 days || 30 Oct 2003 || 179 || align=left | Disc.: Spacewatch || 
|- id="2003 TK2" bgcolor=#FFC2E0
| 0 ||  || APO || 19.7 || data-sort-value="0.41" | 410 m || multiple || 2003–2021 || 28 Nov 2021 || 135 || align=left | Disc.: LINEARPotentially hazardous object || 
|- id="2003 TV2" bgcolor=#fefefe
| 0 ||  || MBA-I || 18.63 || data-sort-value="0.56" | 560 m || multiple || 2003–2021 || 28 Sep 2021 || 48 || align=left | Disc.: SpacewatchAdded on 21 August 2021Alt.: 2014 UJ6 || 
|- id="2003 TW2" bgcolor=#fefefe
| 1 ||  || MBA-I || 19.2 || data-sort-value="0.43" | 430 m || multiple || 2003–2019 || 03 Sep 2019 || 44 || align=left | Disc.: Spacewatch || 
|- id="2003 TE3" bgcolor=#fefefe
| 0 ||  || MBA-I || 18.1 || data-sort-value="0.71" | 710 m || multiple || 2003–2020 || 17 Nov 2020 || 111 || align=left | Disc.: LPL/Spacewatch II || 
|- id="2003 TT3" bgcolor=#d6d6d6
| 0 ||  || MBA-O || 16.2 || 3.2 km || multiple || 2003–2021 || 15 Jan 2021 || 136 || align=left | Disc.: LPL/Spacewatch IIAlt.: 2011 ED56 || 
|- id="2003 TX3" bgcolor=#d6d6d6
| 0 ||  || MBA-O || 16.52 || 3.2 km || multiple || 2003–2021 || 27 Dec 2021 || 152 || align=left | Disc.: LPL/Spacewatch IIAlt.: 2010 BU30 || 
|- id="2003 TF4" bgcolor=#E9E9E9
| 2 ||  || MBA-M || 18.8 || data-sort-value="0.73" | 730 m || multiple || 2003–2020 || 17 Nov 2020 || 38 || align=left | Disc.: LPL/Spacewatch IIAdded on 17 January 2021 || 
|- id="2003 TQ4" bgcolor=#d6d6d6
| 0 ||  || MBA-O || 16.7 || 2.5 km || multiple || 2003–2021 || 06 Jan 2021 || 73 || align=left | Disc.: LPL/Spacewatch II || 
|- id="2003 TV4" bgcolor=#fefefe
| 0 ||  || MBA-I || 18.3 || data-sort-value="0.65" | 650 m || multiple || 2003–2021 || 06 Jan 2021 || 137 || align=left | Disc.: Spacewatch || 
|- id="2003 TQ5" bgcolor=#d6d6d6
| 0 ||  || MBA-O || 17.3 || 1.9 km || multiple || 2003–2019 || 21 Oct 2019 || 32 || align=left | Disc.: LPL/Spacewatch II || 
|- id="2003 TT5" bgcolor=#d6d6d6
| 0 ||  || MBA-O || 16.2 || 3.2 km || multiple || 2003–2020 || 20 Nov 2020 || 103 || align=left | Disc.: SpacewatchAlt.: 2010 CL202, 2015 YL17 || 
|- id="2003 TZ5" bgcolor=#E9E9E9
| 0 ||  || MBA-M || 17.1 || 1.6 km || multiple || 2003–2021 || 16 Jan 2021 || 66 || align=left | Disc.: Spacewatch || 
|- id="2003 TA6" bgcolor=#E9E9E9
| 1 ||  || MBA-M || 17.9 || 1.1 km || multiple || 2003–2021 || 11 Jan 2021 || 145 || align=left | Disc.: LONEOS || 
|- id="2003 TB6" bgcolor=#FA8072
| – ||  || MCA || 19.6 || data-sort-value="0.36" | 360 m || single || 11 days || 02 Oct 2003 || 12 || align=left | Disc.: LONEOS || 
|- id="2003 TF8" bgcolor=#E9E9E9
| 0 ||  || MBA-M || 17.3 || 1.0 km || multiple || 2003–2021 || 04 Jan 2021 || 81 || align=left | Disc.: SpacewatchAlt.: 2011 QR65 || 
|- id="2003 TO9" bgcolor=#FFC2E0
| 0 ||  || APO || 21.9 || data-sort-value="0.15" | 150 m || multiple || 2003–2018 || 10 Aug 2018 || 181 || align=left | Disc.: LONEOSPotentially hazardous object || 
|- id="2003 TR9" bgcolor=#FFC2E0
| 1 ||  || APO || 21.3 || data-sort-value="0.20" | 200 m || multiple || 2003–2020 || 23 Mar 2020 || 53 || align=left | Disc.: LONEOSPotentially hazardous object || 
|- id="2003 TT9" bgcolor=#FFC2E0
| 7 ||  || APO || 22.9 || data-sort-value="0.093" | 93 m || single || 14 days || 28 Oct 2003 || 43 || align=left | Disc.: LONEOS || 
|- id="2003 TX9" bgcolor=#FFC2E0
| 0 ||  || AMO || 20.56 || data-sort-value="0.26" | 230 m || multiple || 2003–20236 || 01 Mar 2023 || 108 || align=left | Disc.: NEAT || 
|- id="2003 TM10" bgcolor=#fefefe
| 2 ||  || MBA-I || 18.9 || data-sort-value="0.49" | 490 m || multiple || 2003–2020 || 15 Dec 2020 || 45 || align=left | Disc.: Table Mountain Obs. || 
|- id="2003 TG12" bgcolor=#d6d6d6
| 0 ||  || MBA-O || 16.5 || 2.8 km || multiple || 2003–2021 || 23 Jan 2021 || 184 || align=left | Disc.: LONEOS || 
|- id="2003 TR13" bgcolor=#fefefe
| 0 ||  || MBA-I || 16.4 || 1.6 km || multiple || 2003–2020 || 22 Apr 2020 || 218 || align=left | Disc.: LONEOS || 
|- id="2003 TG17" bgcolor=#E9E9E9
| 2 ||  || MBA-M || 18.2 || data-sort-value="0.96" | 960 m || multiple || 2003–2021 || 03 Jan 2021 || 56 || align=left | Disc.: LONEOS || 
|- id="2003 TN17" bgcolor=#E9E9E9
| 1 ||  || MBA-M || 17.2 || 1.1 km || multiple || 2003–2020 || 07 Dec 2020 || 57 || align=left | Disc.: NEATAlt.: 2007 RA35 || 
|- id="2003 TY18" bgcolor=#E9E9E9
| 1 ||  || MBA-M || 18.3 || data-sort-value="0.65" | 650 m || multiple || 2003–2021 || 17 Jan 2021 || 79 || align=left | Disc.: LONEOSAlt.: 2017 BP85 || 
|- id="2003 TO21" bgcolor=#d6d6d6
| 0 ||  || MBA-O || 17.4 || 1.8 km || multiple || 2003–2021 || 13 Apr 2021 || 52 || align=left | Disc.: LPL/Spacewatch IIAdded on 11 May 2021 || 
|- id="2003 TV21" bgcolor=#d6d6d6
| 0 ||  || MBA-O || 17.39 || 2.8 km || multiple || 2003–2022 || 07 Jan 2022 || 93 || align=left | Disc.: Spacewatch || 
|- id="2003 TW21" bgcolor=#E9E9E9
| 0 ||  || MBA-M || 17.94 || 1.4 km || multiple || 2003–2021 || 26 Nov 2021 || 76 || align=left | Disc.: SpacewatchAlt.: 2020 JX34 || 
|- id="2003 TA22" bgcolor=#fefefe
| 0 ||  || MBA-I || 17.8 || data-sort-value="0.82" | 820 m || multiple || 2003–2020 || 17 Dec 2020 || 62 || align=left | Disc.: SpacewatchAdded on 9 March 2021Alt.: 2006 SC142 || 
|- id="2003 TD22" bgcolor=#E9E9E9
| 0 ||  || MBA-M || 18.4 || data-sort-value="0.88" | 880 m || multiple || 2003–2020 || 07 Oct 2020 || 64 || align=left | Disc.: Spacewatch || 
|- id="2003 TE22" bgcolor=#E9E9E9
| 0 ||  || MBA-M || 17.32 || 1.9 km || multiple || 2003–2021 || 27 Oct 2021 || 123 || align=left | Disc.: Spacewatch || 
|- id="2003 TG22" bgcolor=#d6d6d6
| 0 ||  || MBA-O || 16.80 || 2.4 km || multiple || 2003–2021 || 12 May 2021 || 112 || align=left | Disc.: SpacewatchAlt.: 2010 GH182 || 
|- id="2003 TH22" bgcolor=#fefefe
| 0 ||  || MBA-I || 18.1 || data-sort-value="0.71" | 710 m || multiple || 2003–2020 || 21 Jul 2020 || 47 || align=left | Disc.: SpacewatchAdded on 22 July 2020 || 
|- id="2003 TR22" bgcolor=#d6d6d6
| 0 ||  || MBA-O || 16.7 || 2.5 km || multiple || 2003–2021 || 16 Jan 2021 || 103 || align=left | Disc.: SpacewatchAlt.: 2014 SD167 || 
|- id="2003 TV22" bgcolor=#d6d6d6
| 0 ||  || MBA-O || 16.5 || 2.8 km || multiple || 2003–2020 || 09 Dec 2020 || 88 || align=left | Disc.: Spacewatch || 
|- id="2003 TA23" bgcolor=#fefefe
| 0 ||  || MBA-I || 18.32 || data-sort-value="0.64" | 640 m || multiple || 2003–2022 || 24 Jan 2022 || 95 || align=left | Disc.: SpacewatchAlt.: 2013 PG57 || 
|- id="2003 TB23" bgcolor=#E9E9E9
| 1 ||  || MBA-M || 18.0 || 1.1 km || multiple || 2003–2020 || 14 Sep 2020 || 72 || align=left | Disc.: Spacewatch || 
|- id="2003 TD23" bgcolor=#fefefe
| 0 ||  || MBA-I || 18.79 || data-sort-value="0.52" | 520 m || multiple || 2003–2021 || 09 Dec 2021 || 80 || align=left | Disc.: Spacewatch || 
|- id="2003 TF23" bgcolor=#fefefe
| 0 ||  || MBA-I || 19.0 || data-sort-value="0.47" | 470 m || multiple || 2003–2018 || 30 Sep 2018 || 31 || align=left | Disc.: SpacewatchAdded on 29 January 2022 || 
|- id="2003 TJ23" bgcolor=#d6d6d6
| 0 ||  || MBA-O || 17.19 || 2.0 km || multiple || 2003–2022 || 25 Jan 2022 || 50 || align=left | Disc.: SpacewatchAlt.: 2014 QP170 || 
|- id="2003 TN23" bgcolor=#d6d6d6
| 0 ||  || MBA-O || 17.14 || 2.1 km || multiple || 2003–2021 || 14 Apr 2021 || 41 || align=left | Disc.: Spacewatch || 
|- id="2003 TA24" bgcolor=#E9E9E9
| 1 ||  || MBA-M || 17.7 || 1.2 km || multiple || 2003–2021 || 05 Jan 2021 || 106 || align=left | Disc.: Spacewatch || 
|- id="2003 TD24" bgcolor=#E9E9E9
| 0 ||  || MBA-M || 17.37 || 1.9 km || multiple || 2003–2021 || 07 Nov 2021 || 78 || align=left | Disc.: SpacewatchAdded on 22 July 2020Alt.: 2015 FH389 || 
|- id="2003 TG24" bgcolor=#fefefe
| 0 ||  || MBA-I || 18.33 || data-sort-value="0.64" | 640 m || multiple || 2003–2022 || 27 Jan 2022 || 69 || align=left | Disc.: SpacewatchAlt.: 2019 BQ9 || 
|- id="2003 TV24" bgcolor=#d6d6d6
| 0 ||  || MBA-O || 16.5 || 2.8 km || multiple || 2003–2019 || 17 Nov 2019 || 111 || align=left | Disc.: Spacewatch || 
|- id="2003 TX24" bgcolor=#d6d6d6
| 0 ||  || MBA-O || 16.74 || 2.5 km || multiple || 2003–2022 || 25 Jan 2022 || 115 || align=left | Disc.: SpacewatchAlt.: 2014 QZ425 || 
|- id="2003 TY24" bgcolor=#E9E9E9
| 2 ||  || MBA-M || 17.6 || 1.7 km || multiple || 2003–2017 || 22 Oct 2017 || 27 || align=left | Disc.: Spacewatch || 
|- id="2003 TD25" bgcolor=#d6d6d6
| 0 ||  || MBA-O || 16.90 || 2.3 km || multiple || 2000–2022 || 25 Jan 2022 || 74 || align=left | Disc.: Spacewatch || 
|- id="2003 TF25" bgcolor=#fefefe
| 1 ||  || MBA-I || 18.8 || data-sort-value="0.52" | 520 m || multiple || 2003–2020 || 05 Nov 2020 || 62 || align=left | Disc.: Spacewatch || 
|- id="2003 TG25" bgcolor=#E9E9E9
| 2 ||  || MBA-M || 19.0 || data-sort-value="0.67" | 670 m || multiple || 2003–2016 || 26 Oct 2016 || 38 || align=left | Disc.: Spacewatch || 
|- id="2003 TP25" bgcolor=#E9E9E9
| 0 ||  || MBA-M || 18.2 || data-sort-value="0.68" | 680 m || multiple || 1999–2020 || 10 Dec 2020 || 41 || align=left | Disc.: Spacewatch || 
|- id="2003 TR25" bgcolor=#d6d6d6
| 0 ||  || MBA-O || 16.39 || 2.9 km || multiple || 2003–2022 || 25 Jan 2022 || 145 || align=left | Disc.: Spacewatch || 
|- id="2003 TX25" bgcolor=#d6d6d6
| 0 ||  || MBA-O || 16.72 || 1.6 km || multiple || 2003–2022 || 25 Jan 2022 || 131 || align=left | Disc.: SpacewatchAlt.: 2010 CK242 || 
|- id="2003 TY25" bgcolor=#d6d6d6
| 0 ||  || MBA-O || 16.5 || 2.8 km || multiple || 2003–2021 || 14 Jan 2021 || 68 || align=left | Disc.: Spacewatch || 
|- id="2003 TC26" bgcolor=#E9E9E9
| 1 ||  || MBA-M || 18.38 || 1.2 km || multiple || 2003–2021 || 04 Oct 2021 || 39 || align=left | Disc.: SpacewatchAdded on 21 August 2021 || 
|- id="2003 TD26" bgcolor=#E9E9E9
| 2 ||  || MBA-M || 18.1 || 1.3 km || multiple || 2003–2017 || 19 Nov 2017 || 47 || align=left | Disc.: SpacewatchAlt.: 2017 RC21 || 
|- id="2003 TG26" bgcolor=#E9E9E9
| 0 ||  || MBA-M || 17.5 || data-sort-value="0.94" | 940 m || multiple || 2003–2020 || 16 Dec 2020 || 85 || align=left | Disc.: Spacewatch || 
|- id="2003 TQ26" bgcolor=#d6d6d6
| 0 ||  || MBA-O || 17.1 || 2.1 km || multiple || 2003–2021 || 14 Jan 2021 || 65 || align=left | Disc.: SpacewatchAlt.: 2014 UO106 || 
|- id="2003 TA27" bgcolor=#d6d6d6
| 3 ||  || MBA-O || 17.9 || 1.5 km || multiple || 2003–2018 || 13 Sep 2018 || 43 || align=left | Disc.: SpacewatchAdded on 24 December 2021 || 
|- id="2003 TB27" bgcolor=#d6d6d6
| 0 ||  || MBA-O || 16.8 || 2.4 km || multiple || 2003–2019 || 22 Aug 2019 || 53 || align=left | Disc.: Spacewatch || 
|- id="2003 TC27" bgcolor=#fefefe
| 2 ||  || MBA-I || 18.5 || data-sort-value="0.59" | 590 m || multiple || 2003–2018 || 15 Oct 2018 || 30 || align=left | Disc.: Spacewatch || 
|- id="2003 TK27" bgcolor=#fefefe
| 0 ||  || MBA-I || 19.09 || data-sort-value="0.45" | 450 m || multiple || 2003–2021 || 08 Nov 2021 || 58 || align=left | Disc.: SpacewatchAlt.: 2014 WX437 || 
|- id="2003 TN27" bgcolor=#d6d6d6
| 1 ||  || MBA-O || 17.4 || 1.8 km || multiple || 2003–2019 || 03 Dec 2019 || 52 || align=left | Disc.: Spacewatch || 
|- id="2003 TS27" bgcolor=#d6d6d6
| 0 ||  || HIL || 15.64 || 4.1 km || multiple || 1999–2022 || 25 Jan 2022 || 94 || align=left | Disc.: Spacewatch || 
|- id="2003 TV27" bgcolor=#E9E9E9
| 0 ||  || MBA-M || 17.86 || data-sort-value="0.80" | 800 m || multiple || 2003–2021 || 08 Apr 2021 || 102 || align=left | Disc.: Spacewatch || 
|- id="2003 TZ27" bgcolor=#fefefe
| 1 ||  || MBA-I || 18.9 || data-sort-value="0.49" | 490 m || multiple || 2003–2019 || 22 Oct 2019 || 48 || align=left | Disc.: Spacewatch || 
|- id="2003 TA28" bgcolor=#fefefe
| 0 ||  || MBA-I || 18.5 || data-sort-value="0.59" | 590 m || multiple || 2003–2019 || 02 Jun 2019 || 31 || align=left | Disc.: SpacewatchAdded on 22 July 2020 || 
|- id="2003 TF28" bgcolor=#fefefe
| 1 ||  || MBA-I || 19.34 || data-sort-value="0.40" | 400 m || multiple || 2003–2021 || 29 Nov 2021 || 36 || align=left | Disc.: SpacewatchAdded on 22 July 2020 || 
|- id="2003 TG28" bgcolor=#fefefe
| 0 ||  || MBA-I || 18.5 || data-sort-value="0.59" | 590 m || multiple || 2001–2020 || 20 Apr 2020 || 65 || align=left | Disc.: SpacewatchAdded on 22 July 2020Alt.: 2012 BL59 || 
|- id="2003 TH28" bgcolor=#fefefe
| 0 ||  || MBA-I || 18.2 || data-sort-value="0.68" | 680 m || multiple || 2003–2020 || 07 Oct 2020 || 90 || align=left | Disc.: SpacewatchAdded on 22 July 2020Alt.: 2009 HJ95, 2013 PW58 || 
|- id="2003 TT28" bgcolor=#fefefe
| 0 ||  || MBA-I || 17.9 || data-sort-value="0.78" | 780 m || multiple || 2003–2020 || 23 Jan 2020 || 65 || align=left | Disc.: Spacewatch || 
|- id="2003 TU28" bgcolor=#E9E9E9
| 0 ||  || MBA-M || 17.66 || 1.2 km || multiple || 2003–2021 || 30 Nov 2021 || 65 || align=left | Disc.: SpacewatchAdded on 21 August 2021 || 
|- id="2003 TV28" bgcolor=#fefefe
| 3 ||  || MBA-I || 19.1 || data-sort-value="0.45" | 450 m || multiple || 1996–2017 || 23 Oct 2017 || 36 || align=left | Disc.: SpacewatchAlt.: 1996 TF44, 2010 RD186 || 
|- id="2003 TK29" bgcolor=#fefefe
| 1 ||  || MBA-I || 18.7 || data-sort-value="0.54" | 540 m || multiple || 2003–2018 || 06 Oct 2018 || 38 || align=left | Disc.: Spacewatch || 
|- id="2003 TQ29" bgcolor=#d6d6d6
| 0 ||  || MBA-O || 17.3 || 1.9 km || multiple || 2003–2019 || 01 Nov 2019 || 34 || align=left | Disc.: Spacewatch || 
|- id="2003 TY29" bgcolor=#E9E9E9
| 0 ||  || MBA-M || 17.32 || 1.4 km || multiple || 2003–2021 || 12 Dec 2021 || 39 || align=left | Disc.: Spacewatch || 
|- id="2003 TA30" bgcolor=#fefefe
| 0 ||  || MBA-I || 18.7 || data-sort-value="0.54" | 540 m || multiple || 2003–2020 || 27 Apr 2020 || 50 || align=left | Disc.: Spacewatch || 
|- id="2003 TX30" bgcolor=#fefefe
| 0 ||  || MBA-I || 18.30 || data-sort-value="0.65" | 650 m || multiple || 2000–2021 || 09 Jul 2021 || 111 || align=left | Disc.: SpacewatchAdded on 22 July 2020Alt.: 2008 DB41 || 
|- id="2003 TA31" bgcolor=#d6d6d6
| 0 ||  || MBA-O || 16.9 || 2.3 km || multiple || 2003–2019 || 01 Nov 2019 || 61 || align=left | Disc.: Spacewatch || 
|- id="2003 TC31" bgcolor=#fefefe
| 0 ||  || MBA-I || 18.5 || data-sort-value="0.59" | 590 m || multiple || 2003–2021 || 30 Nov 2021 || 61 || align=left | Disc.: SpacewatchAdded on 24 December 2021 || 
|- id="2003 TF31" bgcolor=#d6d6d6
| 2 ||  || MBA-O || 17.5 || 1.8 km || multiple || 2003–2019 || 29 Sep 2019 || 33 || align=left | Disc.: SpacewatchAdded on 22 July 2020Alt.: 2014 UC82 || 
|- id="2003 TM31" bgcolor=#fefefe
| 0 ||  || MBA-I || 19.20 || data-sort-value="0.43" | 430 m || multiple || 1999–2021 || 09 May 2021 || 47 || align=left | Disc.: Spacewatch || 
|- id="2003 TT31" bgcolor=#E9E9E9
| 0 ||  || MBA-M || 17.88 || 1.5 km || multiple || 2003–2021 || 07 Sep 2021 || 41 || align=left | Disc.: SpacewatchAlt.: 2008 XH32 || 
|- id="2003 TV31" bgcolor=#E9E9E9
| 1 ||  || MBA-M || 18.7 || data-sort-value="0.76" | 760 m || multiple || 2003–2020 || 24 Oct 2020 || 38 || align=left | Disc.: SpacewatchAdded on 17 January 2021Alt.: 2007 PO48 || 
|- id="2003 TC32" bgcolor=#fefefe
| 0 ||  || MBA-I || 18.67 || data-sort-value="0.55" | 550 m || multiple || 2003–2021 || 09 Dec 2021 || 74 || align=left | Disc.: Spacewatch || 
|- id="2003 TK32" bgcolor=#d6d6d6
| 0 ||  || HIL || 15.8 || 3.9 km || multiple || 2003–2021 || 17 Jan 2021 || 80 || align=left | Disc.: SpacewatchAlt.: 2011 SY268 || 
|- id="2003 TS32" bgcolor=#d6d6d6
| 0 ||  || MBA-O || 17.46 || 1.8 km || multiple || 2003–2017 || 23 Sep 2017 || 34 || align=left | Disc.: SpacewatchAdded on 24 December 2021 || 
|- id="2003 TM33" bgcolor=#d6d6d6
| 0 ||  || MBA-O || 16.8 || 2.4 km || multiple || 2003–2020 || 17 Nov 2020 || 55 || align=left | Disc.: SpacewatchAlt.: 2014 SX195 || 
|- id="2003 TV33" bgcolor=#E9E9E9
| 0 ||  || MBA-M || 17.45 || 1.8 km || multiple || 2003–2021 || 24 Oct 2021 || 68 || align=left | Disc.: Spacewatch || 
|- id="2003 TY33" bgcolor=#d6d6d6
| 0 ||  || MBA-O || 16.76 || 2.5 km || multiple || 2003–2021 || 03 May 2021 || 95 || align=left | Disc.: SpacewatchAlt.: 2010 FR106 || 
|- id="2003 TE34" bgcolor=#fefefe
| 0 ||  || MBA-I || 18.47 || data-sort-value="0.60" | 600 m || multiple || 2001–2021 || 11 Aug 2021 || 55 || align=left | Disc.: Spacewatch || 
|- id="2003 TF34" bgcolor=#d6d6d6
| 0 ||  || MBA-O || 16.5 || 2.8 km || multiple || 2003–2021 || 17 Jan 2021 || 95 || align=left | Disc.: SpacewatchAlt.: 2014 WF380 || 
|- id="2003 TH34" bgcolor=#d6d6d6
| 0 ||  || MBA-O || 16.9 || 2.3 km || multiple || 2003–2020 || 09 Dec 2020 || 60 || align=left | Disc.: SpacewatchAlt.: 2014 UK95 || 
|- id="2003 TK34" bgcolor=#fefefe
| 0 ||  || MBA-I || 17.9 || data-sort-value="0.78" | 780 m || multiple || 2003–2021 || 04 Aug 2021 || 66 || align=left | Disc.: SpacewatchAdded on 30 September 2021Alt.: 2003 UH305 || 
|- id="2003 TM34" bgcolor=#fefefe
| 0 ||  || MBA-I || 18.0 || data-sort-value="0.75" | 750 m || multiple || 2003–2020 || 15 Feb 2020 || 56 || align=left | Disc.: Spacewatch || 
|- id="2003 TU34" bgcolor=#d6d6d6
| 0 ||  || MBA-O || 16.3 || 3.1 km || multiple || 2003–2021 || 17 Jan 2021 || 120 || align=left | Disc.: SpacewatchAlt.: 2017 KY17, 2018 RW18 || 
|- id="2003 TW35" bgcolor=#E9E9E9
| 0 ||  || MBA-M || 18.13 || 1.3 km || multiple || 2003–2021 || 08 Sep 2021 || 65 || align=left | Disc.: Spacewatch || 
|- id="2003 TD36" bgcolor=#d6d6d6
| 1 ||  || MBA-O || 17.5 || 1.8 km || multiple || 2003–2020 || 06 Dec 2020 || 58 || align=left | Disc.: SpacewatchAdded on 17 January 2021 || 
|- id="2003 TN36" bgcolor=#fefefe
| 1 ||  || MBA-I || 18.7 || data-sort-value="0.54" | 540 m || multiple || 2003–2019 || 27 Oct 2019 || 62 || align=left | Disc.: SpacewatchAlt.: 2006 RR67 || 
|- id="2003 TU36" bgcolor=#E9E9E9
| 2 ||  || MBA-M || 18.5 || data-sort-value="0.84" | 840 m || multiple || 2003–2020 || 05 Nov 2020 || 50 || align=left | Disc.: SpacewatchAdded on 17 January 2021 || 
|- id="2003 TW36" bgcolor=#fefefe
| 0 ||  || MBA-I || 18.3 || data-sort-value="0.65" | 650 m || multiple || 2003–2021 || 09 Jan 2021 || 78 || align=left | Disc.: Spacewatch || 
|- id="2003 TA37" bgcolor=#d6d6d6
| 1 ||  || MBA-O || 17.2 || 2.0 km || multiple || 2003–2020 || 07 Oct 2020 || 48 || align=left | Disc.: SpacewatchAlt.: 2015 XH84 || 
|- id="2003 TC37" bgcolor=#E9E9E9
| 1 ||  || MBA-M || 18.3 || data-sort-value="0.92" | 920 m || multiple || 2003–2020 || 14 Oct 2020 || 66 || align=left | Disc.: Spacewatch || 
|- id="2003 TC38" bgcolor=#d6d6d6
| 0 ||  || MBA-O || 17.1 || 2.1 km || multiple || 2003–2020 || 16 Oct 2020 || 71 || align=left | Disc.: SpacewatchAlt.: 2009 WK192 || 
|- id="2003 TG38" bgcolor=#E9E9E9
| 0 ||  || MBA-M || 18.4 || data-sort-value="0.88" | 880 m || multiple || 2003–2020 || 16 Oct 2020 || 43 || align=left | Disc.: SpacewatchAdded on 17 January 2021 || 
|- id="2003 TO38" bgcolor=#d6d6d6
| 1 ||  || MBA-O || 17.22 || 2.0 km || multiple || 2003–2021 || 07 Sep 2021 || 50 || align=left | Disc.: SpacewatchAlt.: 2009 SC314 || 
|- id="2003 TW38" bgcolor=#E9E9E9
| 1 ||  || MBA-M || 18.1 || data-sort-value="0.71" | 710 m || multiple || 2003–2019 || 19 Sep 2019 || 37 || align=left | Disc.: SpacewatchAdded on 21 August 2021 || 
|- id="2003 TZ38" bgcolor=#E9E9E9
| 2 ||  || MBA-M || 18.2 || data-sort-value="0.68" | 680 m || multiple || 2003–2015 || 11 Jul 2015 || 25 || align=left | Disc.: Spacewatch || 
|- id="2003 TD39" bgcolor=#E9E9E9
| 1 ||  || MBA-M || 17.9 || 1.1 km || multiple || 2001–2020 || 15 Dec 2020 || 40 || align=left | Disc.: Spacewatch || 
|- id="2003 TS39" bgcolor=#fefefe
| 0 ||  || MBA-I || 18.43 || data-sort-value="0.61" | 610 m || multiple || 2003–2021 || 30 Oct 2021 || 59 || align=left | Disc.: SpacewatchAdded on 21 August 2021 || 
|- id="2003 TA40" bgcolor=#fefefe
| 0 ||  || HUN || 18.91 || data-sort-value="0.49" | 490 m || multiple || 1995–2021 || 10 May 2021 || 87 || align=left | Disc.: Spacewatch || 
|- id="2003 TC40" bgcolor=#E9E9E9
| 0 ||  || MBA-M || 16.6 || 1.4 km || multiple || 1999–2021 || 11 Jan 2021 || 153 || align=left | Disc.: Spacewatch || 
|- id="2003 TD40" bgcolor=#d6d6d6
| 0 ||  || MBA-O || 16.5 || 2.8 km || multiple || 2003–2021 || 03 Jan 2021 || 95 || align=left | Disc.: Spacewatch || 
|- id="2003 TM40" bgcolor=#fefefe
| 3 ||  || MBA-I || 19.6 || data-sort-value="0.36" | 360 m || multiple || 2003–2006 || 26 Sep 2006 || 18 || align=left | Disc.: SpacewatchAlt.: 2006 QK180 || 
|- id="2003 TS40" bgcolor=#d6d6d6
| 3 ||  || MBA-O || 18.0 || 1.4 km || multiple || 2003–2018 || 15 Dec 2018 || 29 || align=left | Disc.: SpacewatchAlt.: 2013 WQ97 || 
|- id="2003 TV40" bgcolor=#fefefe
| 0 ||  || MBA-I || 18.74 || data-sort-value="0.53" | 530 m || multiple || 2003–2021 || 05 Dec 2021 || 50 || align=left | Disc.: Spacewatch || 
|- id="2003 TX40" bgcolor=#d6d6d6
| 1 ||  || MBA-O || 17.0 || 2.2 km || multiple || 2003–2019 || 24 Aug 2019 || 40 || align=left | Disc.: SpacewatchAlt.: 2014 SH317 || 
|- id="2003 TA41" bgcolor=#E9E9E9
| 0 ||  || MBA-M || 17.45 || 1.8 km || multiple || 2003–2021 || 08 Aug 2021 || 110 || align=left | Disc.: Spacewatch || 
|- id="2003 TM41" bgcolor=#fefefe
| 0 ||  || MBA-I || 17.67 || data-sort-value="0.87" | 870 m || multiple || 2003–2021 || 08 Aug 2021 || 179 || align=left | Disc.: Spacewatch || 
|- id="2003 TQ41" bgcolor=#E9E9E9
| 1 ||  || MBA-M || 18.4 || data-sort-value="0.88" | 880 m || multiple || 1999–2020 || 17 Dec 2020 || 69 || align=left | Disc.: SpacewatchAdded on 19 October 2020Alt.: 2013 BX4 || 
|- id="2003 TR41" bgcolor=#fefefe
| 1 ||  || MBA-I || 18.5 || data-sort-value="0.59" | 590 m || multiple || 2003–2018 || 11 Jul 2018 || 22 || align=left | Disc.: Spacewatch || 
|- id="2003 TT41" bgcolor=#d6d6d6
| 1 ||  || MBA-O || 17.4 || 1.8 km || multiple || 1992–2019 || 21 Sep 2019 || 139 || align=left | Disc.: Spacewatch || 
|- id="2003 TY41" bgcolor=#E9E9E9
| 1 ||  || MBA-M || 18.4 || data-sort-value="0.88" | 880 m || multiple || 2003–2020 || 14 Dec 2020 || 48 || align=left | Disc.: SpacewatchAdded on 17 January 2021 || 
|- id="2003 TB42" bgcolor=#fefefe
| 0 ||  || MBA-I || 18.5 || data-sort-value="0.59" | 590 m || multiple || 2003–2021 || 17 Jan 2021 || 110 || align=left | Disc.: Spacewatch || 
|- id="2003 TF42" bgcolor=#d6d6d6
| 0 ||  || MBA-O || 16.4 || 2.9 km || multiple || 2001–2021 || 17 Jan 2021 || 142 || align=left | Disc.: SpacewatchAlt.: 2006 DY132, 2013 QW22, 2014 WE252 || 
|- id="2003 TP42" bgcolor=#d6d6d6
| 1 ||  || MBA-O || 17.6 || 1.7 km || multiple || 2003–2019 || 30 Nov 2019 || 76 || align=left | Disc.: SpacewatchAlt.: 2014 WO141 || 
|- id="2003 TT42" bgcolor=#E9E9E9
| 0 ||  || MBA-M || 17.55 || 1.7 km || multiple || 2003–2021 || 06 Nov 2021 || 57 || align=left | Disc.: LPL/Spacewatch II || 
|- id="2003 TW43" bgcolor=#d6d6d6
| 0 ||  || MBA-O || 16.23 || 3.2 km || multiple || 2003–2022 || 25 Jan 2022 || 164 || align=left | Disc.: SpacewatchAlt.: 2008 RU7, 2010 BF108, 2015 TL105 || 
|- id="2003 TL44" bgcolor=#d6d6d6
| 0 ||  || MBA-O || 17.6 || 1.7 km || multiple || 2003–2019 || 17 Dec 2019 || 58 || align=left | Disc.: Spacewatch || 
|- id="2003 TM44" bgcolor=#d6d6d6
| 0 ||  || MBA-O || 17.24 || 2.0 km || multiple || 2003–2022 || 25 Jan 2022 || 80 || align=left | Disc.: SpacewatchAdded on 17 January 2021Alt.: 2009 WH74, 2010 CG131 || 
|- id="2003 TW44" bgcolor=#fefefe
| 0 ||  || MBA-I || 18.25 || data-sort-value="0.67" | 670 m || multiple || 2003–2021 || 10 Jul 2021 || 64 || align=left | Disc.: Spacewatch || 
|- id="2003 TX44" bgcolor=#E9E9E9
| 0 ||  || MBA-M || 17.5 || 1.3 km || multiple || 2003–2021 || 09 Jan 2021 || 75 || align=left | Disc.: SpacewatchAdded on 17 January 2021Alt.: 2009 BA26, 2015 PX93 || 
|- id="2003 TQ45" bgcolor=#d6d6d6
| 0 ||  || MBA-O || 15.8 || 3.9 km || multiple || 2003–2021 || 06 Jan 2021 || 192 || align=left | Disc.: SpacewatchAlt.: 2014 SH311 || 
|- id="2003 TR45" bgcolor=#E9E9E9
| 1 ||  || MBA-M || 18.5 || 1.1 km || multiple || 2003–2021 || 26 Oct 2021 || 58 || align=left | Disc.: SpacewatchAdded on 24 December 2021 || 
|- id="2003 TY45" bgcolor=#E9E9E9
| 0 ||  || MBA-M || 17.82 || 1.5 km || multiple || 2003–2021 || 27 Nov 2021 || 81 || align=left | Disc.: SpacewatchAdded on 5 November 2021 || 
|- id="2003 TM46" bgcolor=#d6d6d6
| 0 ||  || MBA-O || 15.9 || 3.7 km || multiple || 2003–2021 || 16 Jan 2021 || 157 || align=left | Disc.: SpacewatchAlt.: 2014 WU405 || 
|- id="2003 TX47" bgcolor=#d6d6d6
| 0 ||  || MBA-O || 16.81 || 2.4 km || multiple || 2003–2021 || 14 Apr 2021 || 104 || align=left | Disc.: Spacewatch || 
|- id="2003 TB48" bgcolor=#d6d6d6
| 0 ||  || MBA-O || 17.1 || 2.1 km || multiple || 2003–2019 || 28 Dec 2019 || 49 || align=left | Disc.: SpacewatchAdded on 21 August 2021 || 
|- id="2003 TK48" bgcolor=#E9E9E9
| 0 ||  || MBA-M || 17.0 || 2.2 km || multiple || 2001–2020 || 03 Apr 2020 || 60 || align=left | Disc.: SpacewatchAlt.: 2010 CH175, 2015 EL26 || 
|- id="2003 TN48" bgcolor=#d6d6d6
| 0 ||  || MBA-O || 16.7 || 2.5 km || multiple || 2003–2021 || 09 Jan 2021 || 123 || align=left | Disc.: Spacewatch || 
|- id="2003 TS48" bgcolor=#E9E9E9
| 0 ||  || MBA-M || 17.0 || 1.2 km || multiple || 2003–2020 || 24 Dec 2020 || 106 || align=left | Disc.: Spacewatch || 
|- id="2003 TW48" bgcolor=#E9E9E9
| 0 ||  || MBA-M || 17.3 || 1.5 km || multiple || 2003–2020 || 06 Dec 2020 || 170 || align=left | Disc.: SpacewatchAlt.: 2015 LD26, 2016 TH50 || 
|- id="2003 TX48" bgcolor=#E9E9E9
| 0 ||  || MBA-M || 18.04 || 1.4 km || multiple || 2003–2021 || 30 Nov 2021 || 88 || align=left | Disc.: SpacewatchAdded on 5 November 2021Alt.: 2012 UT146, 2021 RR100 || 
|- id="2003 TC50" bgcolor=#E9E9E9
| 0 ||  || MBA-M || 16.6 || 2.7 km || multiple || 2003–2021 || 01 Oct 2021 || 148 || align=left | Disc.: AMOS || 
|- id="2003 TO50" bgcolor=#E9E9E9
| 1 ||  || MBA-M || 17.6 || data-sort-value="0.90" | 900 m || multiple || 2003–2020 || 14 Dec 2020 || 76 || align=left | Disc.: Spacewatch || 
|- id="2003 TE51" bgcolor=#E9E9E9
| 1 ||  || MBA-M || 17.5 || 1.3 km || multiple || 2003–2020 || 08 Dec 2020 || 97 || align=left | Disc.: SpacewatchAdded on 17 January 2021 || 
|- id="2003 TW51" bgcolor=#d6d6d6
| 0 ||  || MBA-O || 17.19 || 2.0 km || multiple || 2003–2021 || 06 Apr 2021 || 101 || align=left | Disc.: SpacewatchAlt.: 2016 GV54 || 
|- id="2003 TD52" bgcolor=#d6d6d6
| 0 ||  || MBA-O || 16.3 || 3.1 km || multiple || 2003–2021 || 17 Jan 2021 || 118 || align=left | Disc.: Spacewatch || 
|- id="2003 TH52" bgcolor=#fefefe
| 0 ||  || MBA-I || 18.0 || data-sort-value="0.75" | 750 m || multiple || 2003–2018 || 13 Aug 2018 || 40 || align=left | Disc.: Spacewatch || 
|- id="2003 TK52" bgcolor=#E9E9E9
| 0 ||  || MBA-M || 18.2 || data-sort-value="0.68" | 680 m || multiple || 2003–2020 || 23 Dec 2020 || 32 || align=left | Disc.: Spacewatch || 
|- id="2003 TV52" bgcolor=#fefefe
| 0 ||  || MBA-I || 17.96 || data-sort-value="0.76" | 760 m || multiple || 2003–2021 || 30 Dec 2021 || 108 || align=left | Disc.: Spacewatch || 
|- id="2003 TH53" bgcolor=#fefefe
| 0 ||  || MBA-I || 18.7 || data-sort-value="0.54" | 540 m || multiple || 2003–2021 || 18 Jan 2021 || 49 || align=left | Disc.: SpacewatchAdded on 24 December 2021 || 
|- id="2003 TJ53" bgcolor=#E9E9E9
| 1 ||  || MBA-M || 17.70 || 1.6 km || multiple || 2003–2021 || 02 Dec 2021 || 42 || align=left | Disc.: SpacewatchAdded on 21 August 2021 || 
|- id="2003 TU53" bgcolor=#fefefe
| 0 ||  || MBA-I || 18.6 || data-sort-value="0.57" | 570 m || multiple || 2003–2018 || 12 Nov 2018 || 60 || align=left | Disc.: SpacewatchAlt.: 2014 SQ234 || 
|- id="2003 TW53" bgcolor=#fefefe
| 2 ||  || MBA-I || 19.2 || data-sort-value="0.43" | 430 m || multiple || 2003–2016 || 05 Jul 2016 || 28 || align=left | Disc.: Spacewatch || 
|- id="2003 TZ53" bgcolor=#E9E9E9
| 0 ||  || MBA-M || 17.54 || 1.3 km || multiple || 2003–2022 || 27 Jan 2022 || 128 || align=left | Disc.: Spacewatch || 
|- id="2003 TV54" bgcolor=#d6d6d6
| 0 ||  || MBA-O || 17.3 || 1.9 km || multiple || 2003–2020 || 08 Dec 2020 || 62 || align=left | Disc.: SpacewatchAlt.: 2010 DM105 || 
|- id="2003 TF55" bgcolor=#d6d6d6
| 0 ||  || MBA-O || 16.1 || 3.4 km || multiple || 1992–2021 || 17 Jan 2021 || 226 || align=left | Disc.: SpacewatchAlt.: 2011 EP74 || 
|- id="2003 TG55" bgcolor=#E9E9E9
| 0 ||  || MBA-M || 17.4 || data-sort-value="0.98" | 980 m || multiple || 2003–2021 || 23 Jan 2021 || 106 || align=left | Disc.: Spacewatch || 
|- id="2003 TK55" bgcolor=#fefefe
| 0 ||  || MBA-I || 18.1 || data-sort-value="0.71" | 710 m || multiple || 2003–2021 || 17 Jan 2021 || 112 || align=left | Disc.: Spacewatch || 
|- id="2003 TO55" bgcolor=#d6d6d6
| 0 ||  || MBA-O || 15.9 || 3.7 km || multiple || 2001–2020 || 24 Jun 2020 || 104 || align=left | Disc.: Spacewatch || 
|- id="2003 TX55" bgcolor=#d6d6d6
| 0 ||  || MBA-O || 16.9 || 2.3 km || multiple || 2003–2019 || 26 Nov 2019 || 88 || align=left | Disc.: Spacewatch || 
|- id="2003 TJ56" bgcolor=#E9E9E9
| 0 ||  || MBA-M || 18.1 || 1.0 km || multiple || 2003–2021 || 02 Jan 2021 || 102 || align=left | Disc.: SpacewatchAlt.: 2013 AA19 || 
|- id="2003 TN56" bgcolor=#d6d6d6
| 0 ||  || MBA-O || 16.5 || 2.8 km || multiple || 2003–2021 || 14 Jan 2021 || 135 || align=left | Disc.: SpacewatchAlt.: 2009 WR251, 2010 DF104 || 
|- id="2003 TP57" bgcolor=#E9E9E9
| 0 ||  || MBA-M || 17.6 || 1.3 km || multiple || 2003–2021 || 15 Jan 2021 || 81 || align=left | Disc.: Desert Eagle Obs. || 
|- id="2003 TQ57" bgcolor=#d6d6d6
| 0 ||  || MBA-O || 16.6 || 2.7 km || multiple || 2003–2019 || 15 Nov 2019 || 91 || align=left | Disc.: Desert Eagle Obs.Alt.: 2014 QZ408 || 
|- id="2003 TH58" bgcolor=#C2E0FF
| 3 ||  || TNO || 7.26 || 167 km || multiple || 2002–2020 || 09 Dec 2020 || 40 || align=left | Disc.: Mauna Kea Obs.LoUTNOs, plutino, BR-mag: 0.87; taxonomy: U || 
|- id="2003 TJ58" bgcolor=#C2E0FF
| 3 ||  || TNO || 7.51 || 65 km || multiple || 2003–2020 || 09 Dec 2020 || 55 || align=left | Disc.: Mauna Kea Obs.LoUTNOs, cubewano (cold), albedo: 0.285; binary: 51 km || 
|- id="2003 TK58" bgcolor=#C2E0FF
| 2 ||  || TNO || 6.8 || 145 km || multiple || 2003–2015 || 18 Feb 2015 || 26 || align=left | Disc.: Mauna Kea Obs.LoUTNOs, cubewano (cold) || 
|- id="2003 TL58" bgcolor=#C2E0FF
| 3 ||  || TNO || 7.0 || 204 km || multiple || 2003–2019 || 08 Feb 2019 || 19 || align=left | Disc.: Mauna Kea Obs.LoUTNOs, cubewano (hot) || 
|- id="2003 TD59" bgcolor=#d6d6d6
| 0 ||  || MBA-O || 17.2 || 2.0 km || multiple || 2003–2019 || 29 Nov 2019 || 67 || align=left | Disc.: Spacewatch || 
|- id="2003 TY59" bgcolor=#E9E9E9
| 0 ||  || MBA-M || 17.26 || 2.0 km || multiple || 2003–2021 || 11 Oct 2021 || 124 || align=left | Disc.: LPL/Spacewatch II || 
|- id="2003 TA60" bgcolor=#E9E9E9
| 0 ||  || MBA-M || 16.96 || 2.3 km || multiple || 2003–2021 || 11 Sep 2021 || 143 || align=left | Disc.: LPL/Spacewatch IIAlt.: 2005 EM40 || 
|- id="2003 TH60" bgcolor=#fefefe
| 0 ||  || MBA-I || 17.9 || data-sort-value="0.78" | 780 m || multiple || 2003–2021 || 18 Jan 2021 || 82 || align=left | Disc.: Spacewatch || 
|- id="2003 TJ60" bgcolor=#d6d6d6
| 0 ||  || MBA-O || 16.23 || 3.2 km || multiple || 2003–2021 || 25 Nov 2021 || 160 || align=left | Disc.: Spacewatch || 
|- id="2003 TK60" bgcolor=#d6d6d6
| 0 ||  || MBA-O || 16.2 || 3.2 km || multiple || 2003–2020 || 08 Dec 2020 || 135 || align=left | Disc.: SpacewatchAlt.: 2015 XN63 || 
|- id="2003 TM60" bgcolor=#E9E9E9
| 0 ||  || MBA-M || 16.8 || 2.4 km || multiple || 2003–2020 || 19 Apr 2020 || 74 || align=left | Disc.: Spacewatch || 
|- id="2003 TN60" bgcolor=#E9E9E9
| 0 ||  || MBA-M || 17.39 || 1.9 km || multiple || 2001–2021 || 03 Oct 2021 || 106 || align=left | Disc.: LPL/Spacewatch II || 
|- id="2003 TO60" bgcolor=#fefefe
| 0 ||  || MBA-I || 18.0 || data-sort-value="0.75" | 750 m || multiple || 2003–2021 || 04 Jan 2021 || 92 || align=left | Disc.: Spacewatch || 
|- id="2003 TQ60" bgcolor=#fefefe
| 0 ||  || MBA-I || 18.48 || data-sort-value="0.60" | 600 m || multiple || 2003–2022 || 24 Jan 2022 || 64 || align=left | Disc.: LPL/Spacewatch II || 
|- id="2003 TR60" bgcolor=#d6d6d6
| 0 ||  || MBA-O || 16.5 || 2.8 km || multiple || 2003–2020 || 17 Dec 2020 || 80 || align=left | Disc.: Spacewatch || 
|- id="2003 TS60" bgcolor=#d6d6d6
| 0 ||  || MBA-O || 16.1 || 3.4 km || multiple || 2003–2020 || 11 Dec 2020 || 98 || align=left | Disc.: Spacewatch || 
|- id="2003 TU60" bgcolor=#FA8072
| 0 ||  || MCA || 17.8 || 1.2 km || multiple || 2003–2020 || 14 Sep 2020 || 68 || align=left | Disc.: Spacewatch || 
|- id="2003 TV60" bgcolor=#d6d6d6
| 0 ||  || MBA-O || 15.97 || 3.6 km || multiple || 2003–2022 || 13 Jan 2022 || 122 || align=left | Disc.: SpacewatchAlt.: 2010 CY185 || 
|- id="2003 TX60" bgcolor=#E9E9E9
| 0 ||  || MBA-M || 16.91 || 1.2 km || multiple || 2003–2022 || 13 Jan 2022 || 76 || align=left | Disc.: Spacewatch || 
|- id="2003 TY60" bgcolor=#d6d6d6
| 0 ||  || MBA-O || 16.77 || 2.5 km || multiple || 2003–2022 || 27 Jan 2022 || 84 || align=left | Disc.: Spacewatch || 
|- id="2003 TC61" bgcolor=#d6d6d6
| 0 ||  || MBA-O || 17.04 || 2.2 km || multiple || 2003–2021 || 09 Apr 2021 || 57 || align=left | Disc.: Spacewatch || 
|- id="2003 TF61" bgcolor=#fefefe
| 0 ||  || MBA-I || 18.7 || data-sort-value="0.54" | 540 m || multiple || 2003–2020 || 11 Oct 2020 || 73 || align=left | Disc.: LPL/Spacewatch II || 
|- id="2003 TG61" bgcolor=#E9E9E9
| 0 ||  || MBA-M || 17.46 || 1.8 km || multiple || 2003–2021 || 08 Sep 2021 || 87 || align=left | Disc.: Spacewatch || 
|- id="2003 TK61" bgcolor=#fefefe
| 0 ||  || MBA-I || 18.8 || data-sort-value="0.52" | 520 m || multiple || 2003–2021 || 18 Jan 2021 || 69 || align=left | Disc.: Spacewatch || 
|- id="2003 TL61" bgcolor=#d6d6d6
| 0 ||  || MBA-O || 17.08 || 2.1 km || multiple || 2003–2021 || 03 May 2021 || 51 || align=left | Disc.: Spacewatch || 
|- id="2003 TM61" bgcolor=#E9E9E9
| 0 ||  || MBA-M || 17.4 || 1.8 km || multiple || 2003–2020 || 27 Apr 2020 || 50 || align=left | Disc.: Spacewatch || 
|- id="2003 TN61" bgcolor=#E9E9E9
| 0 ||  || MBA-M || 16.59 || 2.0 km || multiple || 2003–2022 || 15 Jan 2022 || 217 || align=left | Disc.: SpacewatchAlt.: 2010 BP28, 2010 NJ121 || 
|- id="2003 TO61" bgcolor=#fefefe
| 0 ||  || MBA-I || 17.9 || data-sort-value="0.78" | 780 m || multiple || 2003–2021 || 06 Jan 2021 || 173 || align=left | Disc.: LONEOSAlt.: 2003 WP166 || 
|- id="2003 TQ61" bgcolor=#fefefe
| 1 ||  || MBA-I || 19.1 || data-sort-value="0.45" | 450 m || multiple || 2003–2020 || 11 Jun 2020 || 58 || align=left | Disc.: Spacewatch || 
|- id="2003 TS61" bgcolor=#fefefe
| 0 ||  || MBA-I || 18.3 || data-sort-value="0.65" | 650 m || multiple || 2003–2021 || 11 Jan 2021 || 101 || align=left | Disc.: Spacewatch || 
|- id="2003 TT61" bgcolor=#E9E9E9
| 0 ||  || MBA-M || 17.21 || 1.5 km || multiple || 2003–2021 || 12 Dec 2021 || 46 || align=left | Disc.: Spacewatch || 
|- id="2003 TV61" bgcolor=#E9E9E9
| 1 ||  || MBA-M || 17.1 || 1.1 km || multiple || 2003–2018 || 03 May 2018 || 51 || align=left | Disc.: SpacewatchAlt.: 2010 MF98 || 
|- id="2003 TW61" bgcolor=#fefefe
| 2 ||  || MBA-I || 19.0 || data-sort-value="0.47" | 470 m || multiple || 2003–2017 || 21 Nov 2017 || 35 || align=left | Disc.: Spacewatch || 
|- id="2003 TX61" bgcolor=#E9E9E9
| 0 ||  || MBA-M || 17.43 || 1.4 km || multiple || 2003–2022 || 27 Jan 2022 || 109 || align=left | Disc.: Spacewatch || 
|- id="2003 TY61" bgcolor=#d6d6d6
| 0 ||  || MBA-O || 16.4 || 2.9 km || multiple || 2003–2020 || 14 Dec 2020 || 85 || align=left | Disc.: Spacewatch || 
|- id="2003 TB62" bgcolor=#fefefe
| 1 ||  || HUN || 18.6 || data-sort-value="0.57" | 570 m || multiple || 2003–2020 || 18 Jan 2020 || 49 || align=left | Disc.: Spacewatch || 
|- id="2003 TC62" bgcolor=#d6d6d6
| 0 ||  || MBA-O || 16.9 || 2.3 km || multiple || 2003–2020 || 16 Oct 2020 || 70 || align=left | Disc.: Spacewatch || 
|- id="2003 TD62" bgcolor=#E9E9E9
| 0 ||  || MBA-M || 17.4 || 1.4 km || multiple || 2003–2021 || 06 Jan 2021 || 65 || align=left | Disc.: Spacewatch || 
|- id="2003 TE62" bgcolor=#E9E9E9
| 2 ||  || MBA-M || 18.0 || data-sort-value="0.75" | 750 m || multiple || 2003–2019 || 17 Sep 2019 || 37 || align=left | Disc.: Spacewatch || 
|- id="2003 TF62" bgcolor=#E9E9E9
| 0 ||  || MBA-M || 17.5 || data-sort-value="0.94" | 940 m || multiple || 2003–2020 || 11 Dec 2020 || 40 || align=left | Disc.: Spacewatch || 
|- id="2003 TG62" bgcolor=#E9E9E9
| 0 ||  || MBA-M || 17.5 || 1.3 km || multiple || 2003–2020 || 08 Nov 2020 || 44 || align=left | Disc.: LPL/Spacewatch II || 
|- id="2003 TH62" bgcolor=#fefefe
| 0 ||  || MBA-I || 18.7 || data-sort-value="0.54" | 540 m || multiple || 2003–2019 || 25 Nov 2019 || 56 || align=left | Disc.: Spacewatch || 
|- id="2003 TK62" bgcolor=#d6d6d6
| 1 ||  || MBA-O || 17.5 || 1.8 km || multiple || 2003–2016 || 14 Feb 2016 || 25 || align=left | Disc.: Spacewatch || 
|- id="2003 TL62" bgcolor=#E9E9E9
| 0 ||  || MBA-M || 17.3 || 1.9 km || multiple || 2003–2020 || 16 Mar 2020 || 36 || align=left | Disc.: Spacewatch || 
|- id="2003 TM62" bgcolor=#d6d6d6
| 0 ||  || MBA-O || 17.1 || 2.1 km || multiple || 2003–2020 || 14 Dec 2020 || 75 || align=left | Disc.: Spacewatch || 
|- id="2003 TN62" bgcolor=#fefefe
| 0 ||  || MBA-I || 17.71 || data-sort-value="0.85" | 850 m || multiple || 2003–2021 || 01 May 2021 || 109 || align=left | Disc.: Spacewatch || 
|- id="2003 TQ62" bgcolor=#d6d6d6
| 0 ||  || MBA-O || 16.4 || 2.9 km || multiple || 2003–2020 || 11 Nov 2020 || 99 || align=left | Disc.: Spacewatch || 
|- id="2003 TR62" bgcolor=#d6d6d6
| 0 ||  || MBA-O || 15.8 || 3.9 km || multiple || 2003–2020 || 01 Jan 2020 || 97 || align=left | Disc.: SpacewatchAlt.: 2010 HE69 || 
|- id="2003 TT62" bgcolor=#d6d6d6
| 0 ||  || MBA-O || 16.9 || 2.3 km || multiple || 2003–2019 || 28 Oct 2019 || 61 || align=left | Disc.: Spacewatch || 
|- id="2003 TU62" bgcolor=#d6d6d6
| 0 ||  || MBA-O || 17.0 || 2.2 km || multiple || 1998–2020 || 17 Dec 2020 || 63 || align=left | Disc.: LPL/Spacewatch II || 
|- id="2003 TV62" bgcolor=#E9E9E9
| 0 ||  || MBA-M || 17.3 || 1.0 km || multiple || 2003–2021 || 16 Jan 2021 || 103 || align=left | Disc.: Spacewatch || 
|- id="2003 TW62" bgcolor=#d6d6d6
| 0 ||  || MBA-O || 17.05 || 2.2 km || multiple || 2003–2021 || 02 May 2021 || 74 || align=left | Disc.: LPL/Spacewatch II || 
|- id="2003 TX62" bgcolor=#E9E9E9
| 0 ||  || MBA-M || 17.1 || 1.6 km || multiple || 2003–2021 || 08 Jan 2021 || 124 || align=left | Disc.: Spacewatch || 
|- id="2003 TY62" bgcolor=#d6d6d6
| 0 ||  || HIL || 15.4 || 4.6 km || multiple || 2003–2021 || 11 Jan 2021 || 76 || align=left | Disc.: SpacewatchAlt.: 2006 BP155 || 
|- id="2003 TZ62" bgcolor=#d6d6d6
| 0 ||  || MBA-O || 17.0 || 2.2 km || multiple || 2003–2021 || 12 Jan 2021 || 68 || align=left | Disc.: Spacewatch || 
|- id="2003 TB63" bgcolor=#fefefe
| 0 ||  || MBA-I || 18.6 || data-sort-value="0.57" | 570 m || multiple || 2003–2019 || 04 Nov 2019 || 41 || align=left | Disc.: Spacewatch || 
|- id="2003 TC63" bgcolor=#E9E9E9
| 1 ||  || MBA-M || 17.8 || data-sort-value="0.82" | 820 m || multiple || 2003–2021 || 15 Jan 2021 || 55 || align=left | Disc.: Spacewatch || 
|- id="2003 TD63" bgcolor=#d6d6d6
| 0 ||  || MBA-O || 17.25 || 2.0 km || multiple || 2003–2021 || 09 Apr 2021 || 51 || align=left | Disc.: Spacewatch || 
|- id="2003 TE63" bgcolor=#d6d6d6
| 0 ||  || MBA-O || 16.94 || 2.3 km || multiple || 2003–2021 || 14 Apr 2021 || 55 || align=left | Disc.: Spacewatch || 
|- id="2003 TF63" bgcolor=#fefefe
| 0 ||  || MBA-I || 17.8 || data-sort-value="0.82" | 820 m || multiple || 2003–2020 || 16 Feb 2020 || 53 || align=left | Disc.: Spacewatch || 
|- id="2003 TG63" bgcolor=#d6d6d6
| 0 ||  || MBA-O || 16.5 || 2.8 km || multiple || 2003–2020 || 17 Nov 2020 || 91 || align=left | Disc.: Spacewatch || 
|- id="2003 TJ63" bgcolor=#fefefe
| 0 ||  || MBA-I || 19.0 || data-sort-value="0.47" | 470 m || multiple || 2003–2019 || 02 Nov 2019 || 41 || align=left | Disc.: Spacewatch || 
|- id="2003 TK63" bgcolor=#fefefe
| 0 ||  || MBA-I || 18.8 || data-sort-value="0.52" | 520 m || multiple || 2003–2019 || 05 Aug 2019 || 41 || align=left | Disc.: Spacewatch || 
|- id="2003 TL63" bgcolor=#fefefe
| 0 ||  || MBA-I || 18.5 || data-sort-value="0.59" | 590 m || multiple || 1996–2019 || 24 Oct 2019 || 50 || align=left | Disc.: Spacewatch || 
|- id="2003 TM63" bgcolor=#d6d6d6
| 0 ||  || MBA-O || 17.47 || 1.8 km || multiple || 2003–2019 || 22 Oct 2019 || 43 || align=left | Disc.: Spacewatch || 
|- id="2003 TN63" bgcolor=#E9E9E9
| 0 ||  || MBA-M || 17.73 || 1.2 km || multiple || 2003–2021 || 30 Nov 2021 || 70 || align=left | Disc.: Spacewatch || 
|- id="2003 TO63" bgcolor=#E9E9E9
| 0 ||  || MBA-M || 17.6 || 1.3 km || multiple || 2003–2020 || 14 Nov 2020 || 90 || align=left | Disc.: Spacewatch || 
|- id="2003 TP63" bgcolor=#E9E9E9
| 1 ||  || MBA-M || 17.6 || data-sort-value="0.90" | 900 m || multiple || 2003–2019 || 29 Jul 2019 || 37 || align=left | Disc.: Spacewatch || 
|- id="2003 TQ63" bgcolor=#E9E9E9
| 0 ||  || MBA-M || 17.15 || 1.6 km || multiple || 2003–2022 || 06 Jan 2022 || 120 || align=left | Disc.: SpacewatchAlt.: 2010 LG121 || 
|- id="2003 TR63" bgcolor=#fefefe
| 0 ||  || MBA-I || 18.1 || data-sort-value="0.71" | 710 m || multiple || 2003–2019 || 26 Nov 2019 || 131 || align=left | Disc.: Spacewatch || 
|- id="2003 TS63" bgcolor=#d6d6d6
| 0 ||  || MBA-O || 16.6 || 2.7 km || multiple || 2003–2020 || 14 Dec 2020 || 79 || align=left | Disc.: LPL/Spacewatch II || 
|- id="2003 TT63" bgcolor=#E9E9E9
| 0 ||  || MBA-M || 17.5 || data-sort-value="0.94" | 940 m || multiple || 2003–2019 || 24 Sep 2019 || 62 || align=left | Disc.: Spacewatch || 
|- id="2003 TU63" bgcolor=#E9E9E9
| 0 ||  || MBA-M || 17.15 || 2.1 km || multiple || 2003–2021 || 09 Oct 2021 || 125 || align=left | Disc.: Spacewatch || 
|- id="2003 TV63" bgcolor=#E9E9E9
| 0 ||  || MBA-M || 17.38 || 1.9 km || multiple || 2003–2021 || 01 Nov 2021 || 84 || align=left | Disc.: Spacewatch || 
|- id="2003 TW63" bgcolor=#E9E9E9
| 0 ||  || MBA-M || 17.8 || data-sort-value="0.82" | 820 m || multiple || 2003–2019 || 24 Oct 2019 || 51 || align=left | Disc.: Spacewatch || 
|- id="2003 TY63" bgcolor=#E9E9E9
| 0 ||  || MBA-M || 17.9 || 1.1 km || multiple || 2003–2020 || 16 Sep 2020 || 87 || align=left | Disc.: Spacewatch || 
|- id="2003 TZ63" bgcolor=#d6d6d6
| 0 ||  || MBA-O || 16.7 || 2.5 km || multiple || 2003–2019 || 21 Oct 2019 || 42 || align=left | Disc.: Spacewatch || 
|- id="2003 TA64" bgcolor=#fefefe
| 0 ||  || HUN || 18.51 || data-sort-value="0.59" | 590 m || multiple || 2003–2021 || 09 Apr 2021 || 60 || align=left | Disc.: Spacewatch || 
|- id="2003 TB64" bgcolor=#d6d6d6
| 0 ||  || MBA-O || 16.79 || 2.4 km || multiple || 2003–2021 || 06 Dec 2021 || 90 || align=left | Disc.: SpacewatchAlt.: 2010 BM48 || 
|- id="2003 TC64" bgcolor=#fefefe
| 0 ||  || MBA-I || 18.7 || data-sort-value="0.54" | 540 m || multiple || 2003–2020 || 10 Dec 2020 || 38 || align=left | Disc.: Spacewatch || 
|- id="2003 TD64" bgcolor=#d6d6d6
| 0 ||  || MBA-O || 16.4 || 2.9 km || multiple || 2003–2020 || 06 Dec 2020 || 126 || align=left | Disc.: SpacewatchAlt.: 2010 CX17 || 
|- id="2003 TE64" bgcolor=#fefefe
| 0 ||  || MBA-I || 18.7 || data-sort-value="0.54" | 540 m || multiple || 2003–2019 || 28 May 2019 || 30 || align=left | Disc.: LONEOS || 
|- id="2003 TF64" bgcolor=#d6d6d6
| 0 ||  || MBA-O || 16.54 || 2.7 km || multiple || 2003–2022 || 26 Jan 2022 || 63 || align=left | Disc.: SpacewatchAlt.: 2010 DC80 || 
|- id="2003 TG64" bgcolor=#fefefe
| 0 ||  || MBA-I || 19.3 || data-sort-value="0.41" | 410 m || multiple || 2003–2019 || 29 Jul 2019 || 54 || align=left | Disc.: Spacewatch || 
|- id="2003 TH64" bgcolor=#d6d6d6
| 0 ||  || MBA-O || 16.6 || 2.7 km || multiple || 2003–2020 || 14 Dec 2020 || 70 || align=left | Disc.: Spacewatch || 
|- id="2003 TJ64" bgcolor=#E9E9E9
| 0 ||  || MBA-M || 17.0 || 1.7 km || multiple || 2003–2020 || 06 Dec 2020 || 239 || align=left | Disc.: Spacewatch || 
|- id="2003 TK64" bgcolor=#fefefe
| 1 ||  || MBA-I || 19.0 || data-sort-value="0.47" | 470 m || multiple || 2003–2019 || 20 Sep 2019 || 42 || align=left | Disc.: Spacewatch || 
|- id="2003 TL64" bgcolor=#E9E9E9
| 0 ||  || MBA-M || 18.4 || data-sort-value="0.62" | 620 m || multiple || 2003–2019 || 21 Oct 2019 || 53 || align=left | Disc.: Spacewatch || 
|- id="2003 TM64" bgcolor=#E9E9E9
| 3 ||  || MBA-M || 18.1 || data-sort-value="0.71" | 710 m || multiple || 2003–2019 || 29 Oct 2019 || 40 || align=left | Disc.: Spacewatch || 
|- id="2003 TN64" bgcolor=#E9E9E9
| 0 ||  || MBA-M || 17.8 || data-sort-value="0.82" | 820 m || multiple || 2003–2021 || 04 Jan 2021 || 41 || align=left | Disc.: Spacewatch || 
|- id="2003 TO64" bgcolor=#E9E9E9
| 3 ||  || MBA-M || 18.2 || 1.3 km || multiple || 2003–2017 || 28 Oct 2017 || 20 || align=left | Disc.: Spacewatch || 
|- id="2003 TP64" bgcolor=#d6d6d6
| 0 ||  || MBA-O || 17.37 || 1.9 km || multiple || 2003–2021 || 04 Apr 2021 || 96 || align=left | Disc.: Spacewatch || 
|- id="2003 TR64" bgcolor=#d6d6d6
| 0 ||  || MBA-O || 16.7 || 2.5 km || multiple || 2003–2020 || 30 Jan 2020 || 52 || align=left | Disc.: Spacewatch || 
|- id="2003 TS64" bgcolor=#d6d6d6
| 1 ||  || MBA-O || 17.4 || 1.8 km || multiple || 2003–2019 || 26 Nov 2019 || 45 || align=left | Disc.: LPL/Spacewatch II || 
|- id="2003 TU64" bgcolor=#d6d6d6
| 0 ||  || MBA-O || 17.6 || 1.7 km || multiple || 2003–2021 || 15 Jan 2021 || 75 || align=left | Disc.: SpacewatchAlt.: 2010 GW70 || 
|- id="2003 TV64" bgcolor=#E9E9E9
| 0 ||  || MBA-M || 17.8 || 1.2 km || multiple || 1999–2020 || 15 Oct 2020 || 114 || align=left | Disc.: SpacewatchAdded on 22 July 2020 || 
|- id="2003 TW64" bgcolor=#d6d6d6
| 0 ||  || MBA-O || 16.6 || 2.7 km || multiple || 2003–2021 || 18 Jan 2021 || 66 || align=left | Disc.: SpacewatchAdded on 22 July 2020 || 
|- id="2003 TY64" bgcolor=#fefefe
| 0 ||  || MBA-I || 19.0 || data-sort-value="0.47" | 470 m || multiple || 2003–2020 || 17 Nov 2020 || 54 || align=left | Disc.: SpacewatchAdded on 22 July 2020 || 
|- id="2003 TZ64" bgcolor=#fefefe
| 0 ||  || MBA-I || 18.54 || data-sort-value="0.58" | 580 m || multiple || 2003–2021 || 27 Nov 2021 || 81 || align=left | Disc.: SpacewatchAdded on 22 July 2020 || 
|- id="2003 TA65" bgcolor=#fefefe
| 0 ||  || MBA-I || 18.92 || data-sort-value="0.49" | 490 m || multiple || 2003–2021 || 11 Sep 2021 || 44 || align=left | Disc.: SpacewatchAdded on 22 July 2020 || 
|- id="2003 TB65" bgcolor=#E9E9E9
| 1 ||  || MBA-M || 18.8 || data-sort-value="0.73" | 730 m || multiple || 2003–2020 || 23 Sep 2020 || 48 || align=left | Disc.: SpacewatchAdded on 19 October 2020 || 
|- id="2003 TD65" bgcolor=#E9E9E9
| 1 ||  || MBA-M || 18.1 || 1.0 km || multiple || 2003–2020 || 10 Oct 2020 || 54 || align=left | Disc.: SpacewatchAdded on 19 October 2020 || 
|- id="2003 TF65" bgcolor=#FA8072
| 1 ||  || MCA || 19.6 || data-sort-value="0.36" | 360 m || multiple || 2003–2020 || 21 Sep 2020 || 34 || align=left | Disc.: SpacewatchAdded on 17 January 2021 || 
|- id="2003 TG65" bgcolor=#E9E9E9
| 0 ||  || MBA-M || 18.37 || 1.2 km || multiple || 2003–2021 || 26 Oct 2021 || 53 || align=left | Disc.: SpacewatchAdded on 17 January 2021 || 
|- id="2003 TH65" bgcolor=#E9E9E9
| 2 ||  || MBA-M || 18.3 || data-sort-value="0.92" | 920 m || multiple || 2003–2020 || 16 Oct 2020 || 47 || align=left | Disc.: SpacewatchAdded on 17 January 2021 || 
|- id="2003 TJ65" bgcolor=#E9E9E9
| 0 ||  || MBA-M || 17.20 || 2.0 km || multiple || 2003–2021 || 26 Nov 2021 || 171 || align=left | Disc.: SpacewatchAdded on 11 May 2021Alt.: 2016 QY69 || 
|- id="2003 TK65" bgcolor=#E9E9E9
| 1 ||  || MBA-M || 18.7 || data-sort-value="0.76" | 760 m || multiple || 2003–2020 || 20 Oct 2020 || 27 || align=left | Disc.: SpacewatchAdded on 17 January 2021 || 
|- id="2003 TL65" bgcolor=#E9E9E9
| 1 ||  || MBA-M || 17.8 || data-sort-value="0.82" | 820 m || multiple || 1999–2020 || 04 Dec 2020 || 56 || align=left | Disc.: SpacewatchAdded on 17 January 2021 || 
|- id="2003 TM65" bgcolor=#d6d6d6
| 0 ||  || MBA-O || 17.05 || 2.2 km || multiple || 2003–2022 || 26 Jan 2022 || 45 || align=left | Disc.: SpacewatchAdded on 17 January 2021 || 
|- id="2003 TN65" bgcolor=#E9E9E9
| 0 ||  || MBA-M || 17.6 || 1.3 km || multiple || 2003–2021 || 15 Jan 2021 || 50 || align=left | Disc.: SpacewatchAdded on 17 January 2021 || 
|- id="2003 TO65" bgcolor=#E9E9E9
| 1 ||  || MBA-M || 18.3 || data-sort-value="0.65" | 650 m || multiple || 2003–2020 || 14 Dec 2020 || 30 || align=left | Disc.: LPL/Spacewatch IIAdded on 11 May 2021 || 
|- id="2003 TP65" bgcolor=#E9E9E9
| 1 ||  || MBA-M || 18.46 || data-sort-value="0.85" | 850 m || multiple || 2003–2021 || 29 Nov 2021 || 33 || align=left | Disc.: SpacewatchAdded on 17 June 2021 || 
|- id="2003 TQ65" bgcolor=#fefefe
| 0 ||  || MBA-I || 19.90 || data-sort-value="0.31" | 310 m || multiple || 2003–2021 || 08 Sep 2021 || 27 || align=left | Disc.: SpacewatchAdded on 30 September 2021 || 
|- id="2003 TR65" bgcolor=#d6d6d6
| 0 ||  || MBA-O || 16.43 || 2.9 km || multiple || 2003–2021 || 09 Sep 2021 || 62 || align=left | Disc.: SpacewatchAdded on 30 September 2021 || 
|- id="2003 TS65" bgcolor=#E9E9E9
| 2 ||  || MBA-M || 18.5 || 1.1 km || multiple || 2003–2021 || 08 Sep 2021 || 37 || align=left | Disc.: SpacewatchAdded on 30 September 2021 || 
|- id="2003 TT65" bgcolor=#fefefe
| 0 ||  || MBA-I || 18.50 || data-sort-value="0.59" | 590 m || multiple || 2003–2021 || 10 Nov 2021 || 65 || align=left | Disc.: SpacewatchAdded on 30 September 2021 || 
|- id="2003 TV65" bgcolor=#E9E9E9
| 4 ||  || MBA-M || 19.1 || data-sort-value="0.64" | 640 m || multiple || 2003–2020 || 11 Nov 2020 || 16 || align=left | Disc.: SpacewatchAdded on 5 November 2021 || 
|- id="2003 TW65" bgcolor=#E9E9E9
| 0 ||  || MBA-M || 17.83 || data-sort-value="0.81" | 810 m || multiple || 2003–2021 || 12 Feb 2021 || 30 || align=left | Disc.: SpacewatchAdded on 5 November 2021 || 
|- id="2003 TX65" bgcolor=#E9E9E9
| 2 ||  || MBA-M || 19.3 || data-sort-value="0.41" | 410 m || multiple || 2003–2019 || 03 Oct 2019 || 25 || align=left | Disc.: SpacewatchAdded on 5 November 2021 || 
|- id="2003 TY65" bgcolor=#fefefe
| 1 ||  || MBA-I || 19.6 || data-sort-value="0.36" | 360 m || multiple || 2003–2020 || 06 Sep 2020 || 31 || align=left | Disc.: SpacewatchAdded on 5 November 2021 || 
|- id="2003 TZ65" bgcolor=#fefefe
| 0 ||  || MBA-I || 19.09 || data-sort-value="0.45" | 450 m || multiple || 2001–2021 || 30 Nov 2021 || 90 || align=left | Disc.: SpacewatchAdded on 5 November 2021 || 
|- id="2003 TA66" bgcolor=#fefefe
| 0 ||  || HUN || 19.01 || data-sort-value="0.47" | 470 m || multiple || 2003–2021 || 02 Dec 2021 || 67 || align=left | Disc.: SpacewatchAdded on 5 November 2021 || 
|- id="2003 TB66" bgcolor=#d6d6d6
| 1 ||  || MBA-O || 17.43 || 1.8 km || multiple || 2003–2020 || 27 Feb 2020 || 35 || align=left | Disc.: NEATAdded on 24 December 2021 || 
|}
back to top

References 
 

Lists of unnumbered minor planets